Peter Fischer may refer to:

 Peter Fischer (skier) (born 1954), German former alpine skier
 Peter Fischer (politician) (born 1958), Minnesota politician
 Peter M. Fischer, Austrian-Swedish archaeologist
 Peter S. Fischer, American writer and television producer

See also
Peter Fisher (disambiguation)